James Reason Coxen (February 12, 1884 – June 22, 1974) was an American college football coach and educator. He served as the head football coach at Southwest Texas State Normal School—now known as Texas State University–from 1910 to 1912, compiling a record of 4–10–2.

Coxen was born in Eskridge, Kansas. He graduated from Kansas State Agricultural College—now known as Kansas State University—in 1907. Coxen married Anna Vance on May 30, 1912, in Pasadena, California. He was appointed director of vocational work for the Territory of Hawaii in 1925 and held a similar position in Wyoming before that appointment.

Coxen served as a lieutenant commander in the United States Navy during World War II. He died on June 22, 1974, at Queen's Hospital in Honolulu.

Head coaching record

College football

References

External links
 

1884 births
1974 deaths
20th-century American educators
Kansas State University alumni
Texas State Bobcats football coaches
Texas State University faculty
United States Navy officers
United States Navy personnel of World War II
People from Wabaunsee County, Kansas
Coaches of American football from Kansas
Educators from Kansas